The Motorola i58sr is a candybar style cell phone manufactured by Motorola. It was released in 2002. It has a grayscale screen. The phone was used by Nextel and SouthernLINC.

References

i58sr